Mark MacKain is a retired American soccer defender who played in the North American Soccer League, Major Indoor Soccer League and American Soccer League.  He is currently a youth soccer coach.

MacKain graduated from Winter Park High School.  In 1979, he signed with the Atlanta Chiefs of the North American Soccer League.  In 1981, he moved to the New Jersey Rockets of the Major Indoor Soccer League for one season.  In 1982, he played for the Georgia Generals in the American Soccer League.  He later played for the amateur Soccer City Soccer Club in Atlanta and for Wings Soccer Club, also based in Atlanta.

MacKain became a youth soccer coach with a variety of clubs in the Atlanta area before being elected to the US Club Soccer Board of Directors in 2009.

References

External links
 NASL/MISL stats
 Mark MacKain All-In FC coaching bio

1961 births
Living people
American soccer coaches
American soccer players
American Soccer League (1933–1983) players
Atlanta Chiefs players
Georgia Generals players
Major Indoor Soccer League (1978–1992) players
North American Soccer League (1968–1984) players
New Jersey Rockets (MISL) players
Parade High School All-Americans (boys' soccer)
Association football defenders